The Man from Texas may refer to:
 The Man from Texas (1915 film), an American Western film
 The Man from Texas (1948 film), an American Western film
 Man from Texas (1939 film), an American Western film